The Świnoujście Tunnel is a tunnel under construction beneath the river Świna in Świnoujście, Poland, connecting the islands of Usedom and Wolin, and the city centre of Świnoujście with the rest of the country. The original planned opening date of the tunnel was 17 September 2022, but as of October 29, 2022, the date has been moved to a more vague 4th quarter of 2022. Currently, it is implied that the tunnel will be opened in May 2023.

Once complete, the tunnel will provide a direct crossing for route 93 in the Polish national roads network. From the westside (left bank) of the river Świna, the tunnel entry will begin at Karsiborska Street. On the eastside (right bank), the tunnel will join the end of the Polish section of the European route E65 by Fińska Street. After opening, the existing ferry route will be preserved for pedestrians and cyclists.

Geography
Świnoujście is the only city in Poland located on multiple (44 in total) islands and islets, of which only three are permanently inhabited: Usedom, Wolin, and Karsibór. Most of the city's population (80 per cent) lives on the left bank of the city on the island of Usedom. The westside of the city is also home to the centre of the city, hosting services, and tourist points of interest. The right bank of the city on the island of Wolin contains the city's sea, rail, and road transit hub. The city is divided by the strait of the river Świna, which is also the fairway for sea traffic between Szczecin and the Baltic Sea. The island of Usedom lacks direct road access with the rest of Poland. A land crossing is possible through German territory, using a bridge across the river Peenestrom.

History
The contract for the design and construction of the tunnel was signed on 17 September 2018 with a consortium of PORR SA (consortium leader), PORR Bau GmbH, Gülermak, and Energopol - Szczecin SA, whose offer amounted to PLN 793.186 million.

The cost of the investment is estimated at PLN 915 million, of which 775.6 million comes from the European Union funds. The Świnoujście local government will contribute nearly PLN 140 million.

References

External links

Undersea tunnels in Europe
Tunnels in Poland